Hebrew Free Loan Association of Northeast Ohio (HFLA) is a non-sectarian 501(c)(3) non-profit organization that loans money interest-free to people who do not have easy access to other capital. The organization has made over 25,000 interest-free loans in Northeast Ohio. Between 97% to 99% of all funds loaned are repaid.

History

HFLA was founded in 1904 with $501 in capital donated by Morris A. Black, Charles Ettinger and Herman Stern. In the first year, loans ranged from $10 to $37 and were all repaid in full. In 1909, the organization made 700 loans, including 288 for peddling and huckstering, 86 for renting or purchasing horses and wagons, 119 for supply stores or pushcarts, 42 for starting a business, 62 for emigration purposes, 42 for hiring carpenters or painters, 18 for tools for mechanics, and 43 for tuition or other uses.

All loans are interest-free based on a Jewish biblical tradition. "If you go to the Torah, the highest form of tzedakah is not giving someone a gift of money, it's giving someone the ability to help themselves," said David Edelman, President of the Association. "Giving someone an interest-free loan is considered one of the highest forms of charity."

In 1982, the Hebrew Free Loan Association of Northeast Ohio became an independent member of International Association of Hebrew Free Loans.

Loan Program

HFLA offers interest-free loans of up to $10,000 to individuals who qualify: have an ability to pay the loan back, lack access to traditional financial products, and have a need that an interest-free loan could fill. Borrowers and co-signers must live in Northeast Ohio. One co-signer is required for every $4,000 that is borrowed. HFLA lends money for many purposes, including but not limited to:

 Medical and dental bills
 Home repairs
 Escaping predatory lending
 Apartment rental and deposits
 Home purchase closing costs
 Immigration
 Adoption
 Fertility treatments
 Camps
 Education, including vocational and job training

Awards 

In 1984, HFLA received the Isaiah Award for Human Relations from the Cleveland Chapter of the American Jewish Committee.

References

External links 
 

Microfinance organizations
Charities based in Ohio
Organizations established in 1904
Jewish charities based in the United States